Macella is a genus of moths of the family Erebidae. The genus was erected by Francis Walker in 1859.

Macella is the plural of macellum, a market of ancient Rome.

Species
Macella euritiusalis Walker, 1858
Macella flavithorax Gaede, 1940
Macella sexmaculata Holland, 1894
Macella sideris Holland, 1894

References

Calpinae